Quonochontaug is a village in Washington County, Rhode Island, United States. It is composed of three small beach communities, and is part of Charlestown.

Geography
Quonochontaug is located between the Ninigret Pond and Quonochontaug Pond and their respective barrier beaches, both of which are salt ponds. The communities of West Beach, Central Beach, and East Beach house several hundred residents, mostly in the summers, and many houses are available as summer rentals.

Blue Shutters Beach is town-owned and is located at the end of East Beach Road in Quonochontaug. To the east of Blue Shutters, an unpaved road leads to the entrance of the Ninigret National Wildlife Refuge.  The area was listed as a census-designated place in the 2010 census.

History
Quonochontaug was the site of an iron mining operation financed by Thomas A. Edison in the 1880s. Iron particles existed in the form of black sand on the beach, and they could be separated out with magnets & melted to produce iron. The venture failed after cheaper iron was later discovered.

Historic places
 Babcock House

In popular culture
In the TV series The X-Files, there are several references to Quonochontaug, related to one of its protagonists, Fox Mulder, whose family had a summer home there.

References

External links 

 Quonochontaug East Beach Association

Census-designated places in Rhode Island
Census-designated places in Washington County, Rhode Island
Charlestown, Rhode Island
Populated coastal places in Rhode Island
Providence metropolitan area
Villages in Rhode Island
Villages in Washington County, Rhode Island